Paul Douglas Collins (born July 28, 1951) is an American basketball executive, former player, coach and television analyst in the National Basketball Association (NBA). He played in the NBA from 1973 to 1981 for the Philadelphia 76ers, earning four NBA All-Star selections. He then became an NBA coach in 1986, and had stints coaching the Chicago Bulls, Detroit Pistons, Washington Wizards and Philadelphia 76ers. Collins also served as an analyst for various NBA-related broadcast shows. He is a recipient of the Curt Gowdy Media Award.

Early life
Collins was born in Christopher, Illinois. He grew up in Benton, Illinois, where his next-door neighbor was future film star John Malkovich. Collins enjoyed a successful high school basketball career at Benton Consolidated High School under renowned coach Rich Herrin

College career 
Collins went on to play for Illinois State University in Normal, Illinois, coached from 1970 by Will Robinson, the first black head coach in NCAA Division I.

Professional career

Philadelphia 76ers (1973–1981) 
Collins was drafted first overall in the 1973 NBA draft by the Philadelphia 76ers. He played eight seasons for Philadelphia, and was an NBA All-Star four times. In the 1976–77 season, he joined Julius Erving leading the Sixers to the NBA Finals, where they lost to the Portland Trail Blazers.

A rash of injuries to his feet and left knee beginning in 1979 would end Collins' career in 1981. In all, he played 415 NBA games, scoring 7,427 points (17.9 per game).

Coaching career
After his retirement, Collins turned to coaching. He joined Bob Weinhauer's staff at Penn as an assistant coach and later followed Weinhauer to Arizona State for the same job.

Chicago Bulls (1986–1989) 
In May 1986, Collins was named head coach of the Chicago Bulls; the team featured a young Michael Jordan who was entering his third season. Despite having Jordan, the Bulls were coming off a 30–52 season and fired their past two coaches after one season each.

Collins immediately helped the Bulls turn around their fortunes, showing an improvement of 10 games in each of his first two seasons, coaching Chicago to a 50–32 record in his second year. In his third year as coach, he brought Chicago to their first Eastern Conference Finals Appearance in 15 years, however, they were unable to get past their Central Division rival the "Bad Boys" Detroit Pistons. Despite the Bulls' success and his popularity in Chicago, Collins was fired in the summer of 1989.

Detroit Pistons (1995–1998) 
Collins was named the head coach of the Detroit Pistons in 1995. His arrival in Detroit was similar to his in Chicago, as the Pistons had a second-year star who drew comparisons to Michael Jordan, Grant Hill. In his first season, he was able to improve the team's previous season's record by 18 games and lead them back to the playoffs, though they would be swept by the Orlando Magic.

A fast start in his second season pushed Hill to the top of MVP consideration and Collins was named the Eastern Conference All-Star team's coach. The highlight of the year for Collins came on April 13, when the Pistons defeated the defending champion Bulls to end Detroit's 19-game losing streak against Chicago. (Incidentally Collins ended a Chicago losing streak against the Pistons in the 80's.) The Pistons finished 54–28 and lost in the first round of playoffs to the Atlanta Hawks, 3–2 in the best-of-five series.

He served as Pistons' head coach until February 2, 1998, when he was fired and replaced by Alvin Gentry. Collins then became a television broadcaster, working for many years at various networks, such as NBC on the NBA on NBC and TNT on the NBA on TNT.

Washington Wizards (2001–2003) 
Collins worked as a broadcaster for about three years before being hired to coach the Washington Wizards for the start of the 2001–02 NBA season. In Washington, Collins was reunited with Michael Jordan and Charles Oakley. Once again, in his first season with his new team, Collins improved the team's previous season's record by 18 games. Though his .451 winning percentage through 2 seasons was better than the Wizards' .308 record the previous 2 seasons (and subsequent .305 record the following season), Collins was fired at the conclusion of the 2002–03 season.

Philadelphia 76ers (2010–2013) 
On May 21, 2010, Collins was hired as head coach of the Philadelphia 76ers. While the 76ers initially started out poorly with a record of 3–13, the team showed great improvement as the season went on, and clinched the seventh seed in the Eastern Conference for the playoffs. Under Collins, the team increased its win total by 14 games over the previous season. They lost to the eventual Eastern Conference champion Miami Heat in the first round, but were able to avoid a sweep that had been predicted. Collins finished second in Coach of the Year voting that season.

In the lockout-shortened 2011–2012 season, Collins led the Sixers to an improved record, but Philadelphia was only able to take the eighth seed in the playoffs. Against the top seeded Chicago Bulls, Collins led the Sixers to their first playoff series victory since 2003. It was the fifth time in NBA history that an eighth seed defeated a first seed in a playoff series. They took the next series against the Boston Celtics to seven games, but lost.

Collins resigned as 76ers coach on April 18, 2013, citing a need to spend more time with his five grandchildren. It was announced that he would stay with the team as an adviser.

National team career

Collins represented the United States at the 1972 Summer Olympics in Munich, West Germany. Those basketball games are remembered by U.S. fans mainly for the controversial gold medal basketball game between the United States and the Soviet Union, in which Collins played a key part.

Broadcasting career
Collins started doing work for CBS in the mid-1980s, calling mostly playoff games. He also was the lead color analyst for the local broadcasts of the 76ers' games during the 1985–86 season. In-between his various coaching stints he has done broadcasting work for CBS, NBC, TNT, TBS, and ABC/ESPN. He also called games for the New York Knicks during the 2003–04 season on MSG Network on a part-time basis, paired with Marv Albert.

After being fired by the Wizards, Collins returned to announcing games for TNT. In addition, he served as an analyst for NBC Sports' TV coverage of basketball at the 2008 Summer Olympics in Beijing. He also was a basketball analyst for NBC during the 2012 Summer Olympics in London.

During this time, Collins's name surfaced several times regarding head coaching vacancies. In 2005, he was a candidate for the Milwaukee Bucks job but was passed over for Terry Stotts. Collins was approached by the team again in 2008 to serve as their GM and coach but turned them down again. In May 2008, Collins was in negotiations to coach the Chicago Bulls, nearly 20 years after he was fired from the team. However, Collins withdrew his name when he and owner Jerry Reinsdorf "agreed it wasn't the best to keep going this way," in light of their close personal friendship.

Executive career

Chicago Bulls (2017–present) 
On September 19, 2017, the Chicago Bulls announced that Collins had joined the team as senior advisor of basketball operations.

Personal life

Collins and his wife Kathy have two children. They reside in the Delaware Valley. Their son Chris, a former Duke University basketball player, is the head basketball coach at Northwestern University and their daughter Kelly, who played basketball at Lehigh University, is a school teacher in Pennsylvania.

Awards and honors

Illinois State University's basketball court is named after Collins (Doug Collins Court at Redbird Arena). A statue depicting Collins and his ISU coach, Will Robinson, was unveiled on September 19, 2009, outside the north entrance of Redbird Arena.

Collins was inducted as a Laureate of The Lincoln Academy of Illinois and awarded the Order of Lincoln (the State’s highest honor) by the Governor of Illinois on June 19, 2021.

NBA career statistics

Regular season

|-
| style="text-align:left;"|
| style="text-align:left;"|Philadelphia
| 25 ||  || 17.4 || .371 ||  || .764 || 1.8 || 1.6 || .5 || .1 || 8.0
|-
| style="text-align:left;"|
| style="text-align:left;"|Philadelphia
| 81 ||  || 34.8 || .488 ||  || .844 || 3.9 || 2.6 || 1.3 || .2 || 17.9
|-
| style="text-align:left;"|
| style="text-align:left;"|Philadelphia
| 77 ||  || 38.9 || .513 ||  || .836 || 4.0 || 2.5 || 1.4 || .3 || 20.8
|-
| style="text-align:left;"|
| style="text-align:left;"|Philadelphia
| 58 ||  || 35.1 || .518 ||  || .840 || 3.4 || 4.7 || 1.2 || .3 || 18.3
|-
| style="text-align:left;"|
| style="text-align:left;"|Philadelphia
| 79 ||  || 35.1 || .526 ||  || .812 || 2.9 || 4.1 || 1.6 || .3 || 19.7
|-
| style="text-align:left;"|
| style="text-align:left;"|Philadelphia
| 47 ||  || 33.9 || .499 ||  || .814 || 2.6 || 4.1 || 1.1 || .4 || 19.5
|-
| style="text-align:left;"|
| style="text-align:left;"|Philadelphia
| 36 ||  || 26.8|| .466 || .000 || .911 || 2.6 || 2.8 || .8 || .2 || 13.8
|-
| style="text-align:left;"|
| style="text-align:left;"|Philadelphia
| 12 ||  || 27.4 || .492 ||  || .828 || 2.4 || 3.5 || .6 || .3 || 12.3
|- class="sortbottom"
| style="text-align:center;" colspan="2"|Career
| 415 ||  || 33.6 || .501 || .000 || .833 || 3.2 || 3.3 || 1.2 || .3 || 17.9
|- class="sortbottom"
| style="text-align:center;" colspan="2"|All-Star
| 3 || 1 || 22.7 || .458 ||  || .800 || 4.3 || 5.7 || 2.0 || .0 || 11.3

Playoffs

|-
| style="text-align:left;"|1976
| style="text-align:left;”|Philadelphia
| 3 ||  || 39.0 || .434 ||  || .857 || 7.0 || 3.3 || 1.0 || .3 || 19.3
|-
| style="text-align:left;"|1977
| style="text-align:left;”|Philadelphia
| 19 ||  || 39.9 || .557 ||  || .740 || 4.2 || 3.9 || 1.5 || .2 || 22.4
|-
| style="text-align:left;"|1978
| style="text-align:left;”|Philadelphia
| 10 ||  || 34.2 || .497 ||  || .816 || 3.1 || 2.7 || .3 || .0 || 20.4
|- class="sortbottom"
| style="text-align:center;" colspan="2"|Career
| 32 ||  || 38.1 || .526 ||  || .855 || 4.1 || 3.5 || 1.1 || .1 || 21.5

Head coaching record

|-
| style="text-align:left;"|Chicago
| style="text-align:left;"|
| 82 || 40 || 42 ||  || style="text-align:center;"|5th in Central || 3 || 0 || 3 || 
| style="text-align:center;"|Lost in First Round
|-
| style="text-align:left;"|Chicago
| style="text-align:left;"|
| 82 || 50 || 32 ||  || style="text-align:center;"|2nd in Central || 10 || 4 || 6 || 
| style="text-align:center;"|Lost in Conference Semifinals
|-
| style="text-align:left;"|Chicago
| style="text-align:left;"|
| 82 || 47 || 35 ||  || style="text-align:center;"|5th in Central || 17 || 9 || 8 || 
| style="text-align:center;"|Lost in Conference Finals
|-
| style="text-align:left;"|Detroit
| style="text-align:left;"|
| 82 || 46 || 36 ||  || style="text-align:center;"|4th in Central || 3 || 0 || 3 || 
| style="text-align:center;"|Lost in First Round
|-
| style="text-align:left;"|Detroit
| style="text-align:left;"|
| 82 || 54 || 28 ||  || style="text-align:center;"|3rd in Central || 5 || 2 || 3 || 
| style="text-align:center;"|Lost in First Round
|-
| style="text-align:left;"|Detroit
| style="text-align:left;"|
| 45 || 21 || 24 ||  || style="text-align:center;"|(fired) ||  ||  ||  || 
| style="text-align:center;"|
|-
| style="text-align:left;"|Washington
| style="text-align:left;"|
| 82 || 37 || 45 ||  || style="text-align:center;"|5th in Atlantic ||  ||  ||  || 
| style="text-align:center;"|Missed playoffs
|-
| style="text-align:left;"|Washington
| style="text-align:left;"|
| 82 || 37 || 45 ||  || style="text-align:center;"|5th in Atlantic ||  ||  ||  || 
| style="text-align:center;"|Missed playoffs
|-
| style="text-align:left;"|Philadelphia
| style="text-align:left;"|
| 82 || 41 || 41 ||  || style="text-align:center;"|3rd in Atlantic || 5 || 1 || 4 || 
| style="text-align:center;"|Lost in First Round
|-
| style="text-align:left;"|Philadelphia
| style="text-align:left;"|
| 66 || 35 || 31 ||  || style="text-align:center;"|3rd in Atlantic || 13 || 7 || 6 || 
| style="text-align:center;"|Lost in Conference Semifinals
|-
| style="text-align:left;"|Philadelphia
| style="text-align:left;"|
| 82 || 34 || 48 ||  || style="text-align:center;"|4th in Atlantic ||  ||  ||  || 
| style="text-align:center;"|Missed playoffs
|- class="sortbottom"
| colspan="2" style="text-align:center;"|Career
| 849 || 442 || 407 ||  ||   || 56 || 23 || 33 ||  ||

References

External links

1951 births
Living people
All-American college men's basketball players
American men's basketball players
Basketball coaches from Illinois
Basketball players at the 1972 Summer Olympics
Basketball players from Illinois
Chicago Bulls head coaches
College basketball announcers in the United States
Detroit Pistons head coaches
Illinois State Redbirds men's basketball players
Medalists at the 1972 Summer Olympics
National Basketball Association All-Stars
National Basketball Association broadcasters
Olympic silver medalists for the United States in basketball
People from Benton, Illinois
People from Christopher, Illinois
Philadelphia 76ers draft picks
Philadelphia 76ers head coaches
Philadelphia 76ers players
Shooting guards
Small forwards
United States men's national basketball team players
Washington Wizards head coaches